is Morning Musume's sixth-best album that was released in Japan on September 25, 2013. It features updated versions of their past and recent singles with the current members of the group and it was released in two editions: a Regular Edition and a Limited Edition coming with a bonus DVD.

This is the first Morning Musume album to feature 11th-generation member Oda Sakura.

Track list
All songs are composed by Tsunku

CD
 Love Machine (updated)
 I Wish (updated)
 Ren'ai Revolution 21 (updated)
 The Peace! (updated)
 Sōda! We're Alive (updated)
 The Manpower!!! (updated)
 Aruiteru (updated)
 Ren'ai Hunter (updated)
 One Two Three (updated)
 Wakuteka Take a Chance (updated)
 Help me!! (updated)
 Brainstorming (updated)
 Kimi Sae Ireba Nani mo Iranai (updated)
 Wagamama Ki no Mama Ai no Joke
 Wolf Boy

DVD
 Wagamama Ki no Mama Ai no Joke (Dance Shot Ver. II)
 Ai no Gundan (Dance Shot Ver. II)
 The Best!: Updated Morning Musume 'Album Making-of and Interview Video'

Morning Musume compilation albums
Zetima compilation albums
2013 greatest hits albums
2013 remix albums
Japanese-language compilation albums